The Easter Parade is a novel by American writer Richard Yates. Published in 1976, Yates's book explores the tragic lives of two sisters.  Along with Revolutionary Road, his debut novel, the book is considered to be Yates' finest work.

Summary
The famous opening line of the novel warns of the bleak narrative to follow: "Neither of the Grimes sisters would have a happy life, and looking back it always seemed that the trouble began with their parents' divorce." Emily and Sarah are sisters who share little in terms of character, but much in terms of disappointment with their lives. Emily, the younger and more intellectual and cosmopolitan of the two, seeks love in numerous disappointing affairs and short-term relationships. Sarah, the prettier and more conventional one, marries young and bears children to an uncouth and abusive husband.

The novel begins in the 1930s, when the sisters are children, and ends in the 1970s several years after Sarah's death. It primarily revolves around Emily as the book's central character, but the book employs Yates' characteristic shifts of consciousness throughout.  Their troubled, rootless mother Pookie, like many Yatesian matriarchs, is likely modeled on his own mother, who was nicknamed Dookie.

Critical reception
Stewart O'Nan notes "The Easter Parade signaled the resurgence of Richard Yates. A year after the critically panned Disturbing the Peace, critics hailed him as an American master. They spoke now of his body of work and raved over the effortless elegance of his prose and the depth of his tragic vision." The publication of The Easter Parade marked the beginning of a relatively stable and productive period for Yates, and the book has been championed by Joan Didion, David Sedaris, Kurt Vonnegut, Larry McMurtry and Tao Lin, among others.

The novel was a finalist for the 1976 National Book Critics Circle Award.

Film adaptation
In 2005, Caroline Kaplan acquired the rights for a film adaptation to the novel.

In popular culture
The novel is mentioned in Woody Allen's film Hannah and Her Sisters (1986): Lee (Barbara Hershey), one of the titular "sisters", thanks her brother-in-law Eliot (Michael Caine) for lending her the book. Lee tells Eliot that she "loved" the book and that he was right because "it had very special meaning" for her. Allen was attracted to the novel due to his appreciation for "books that explore the psyches of women, particularly intelligent ones."

Notes

External links
 Ploughshares review by Hilma Wolitzer 

1976 American novels
Novels by Richard Yates
Works about sisters
Third-person narrative novels
Novels set in New York City
Novels set in Iowa